Rusticoville is an unincorporated rural community in the township of Lot 23, Queens County, Prince Edward Island, Canada.

Rusticoville is located south of North Rustico and in the central part of the province on the north shore, fronting the Gulf of St. Lawrence.

References

Communities in Queens County, Prince Edward Island